Elisabet "Elsbeth" van Rooy-Vink (born 25 January 1973 in Wijk en Aalburg) is a Dutch cyclist specializing in competitive mountain biking.

Van Rooy-Vink represented the Netherlands at the 1996 Summer Olympics in Atlanta in both the road race and mountain biking, while at the 2004 Summer Olympics in Athens she only competed in mountain biking. In Atlanta's road race, she finished in 28th position, 53 seconds behind the winner. She did better in mountain biking, ranking fifth. She repeated this performance in Athens, eight years later, again ranking fifth.

See also
 List of Dutch Olympic cyclists

External links
Van Rooy-Vink at the Dutch Olympic Archive

1973 births
Living people
Dutch mountain bikers
Dutch female cyclists
Cyclists at the 1996 Summer Olympics
Cyclists at the 2004 Summer Olympics
Cyclists at the 2008 Summer Olympics
Olympic cyclists of the Netherlands
UCI Road World Championships cyclists for the Netherlands
Cyclists from North Brabant
People from Altena, North Brabant